Kobe A. Smith (born June 23, 1998) is an American football defensive end for the San Antonio Brahmas of the XFL. He played college football at the South Carolina and was signed by the Tennessee Titans as an undrafted free agent in 2020.

Professional career

Tennessee Titans
After going unselected in the 2020 NFL Draft, Smith was signed by the Tennessee Titans as an undrafted free agent on May 7, 2020. He was waived on September 5, 2020 and re-signed to the practice squad. He was released on September 21.

Tampa Bay Buccaneers
On October 20, 2020, Smith was signed to the Tampa Bay Buccaneers practice squad. He signed a reserve/future contract on February 9, 2021. He was waived on August 31, 2021 and re-signed to the practice squad. He signed a reserve/future contract on January 24, 2022. He was waived on May 16, 2022.

Philadelphia Eagles
On July 26, 2022, Smith signed with the Philadelphia Eagles. He was waived/injured on August 30, 2022 and placed on injured reserve. He was released on September 8.

Atlanta Falcons
On October 10, 2022, Smith was signed to the Atlanta Falcons practice squad.

References

1998 births
Living people
American football defensive tackles
South Carolina Gamecocks football players
Tennessee Titans players
Tampa Bay Buccaneers players
Philadelphia Eagles players
Atlanta Falcons players